Zəhmətabad or Zakhmetabad may refer to:

Zəhmətabad, Bilasuvar, Azerbaijan
Zəhmətabad, Jalilabad, Azerbaijan